An election to Offaly County Council took place on 27 June 1991 as part of that year's Irish local elections. 21 councillors were elected from five electoral divisions by PR-STV voting for an eight-year term of office.

Results by party

Results by Electoral Area

Birr

Edenderry

Ferbane

Tullamore

External links
 Official website
 irishelectionliterature

1991 Irish local elections
1991